The E 232 is a European B class road in the Netherlands, connecting the cities of Amersfoort and Groningen.

The highway is maintained by Rijkswaterstaat.

Highway connections 

The E 232 has a total length of 174 kilometres, and serves as the connector between the E 30 and the E 22 (hence its number). From south to north the following highways share junctions with the E 232:

E30 (Highway 1) – Hoevelaken
E231 (Highway 1) – Hoevelaken
N94 (Highway 302) – Harderwijk
N93 (Highway 50) – Hattemerbroek
N90(Z) (Highway 35) – Zwollerkerspel
N90(N) (Highway 32) – Lankhorst
E233 (Highway 37) – Hoogeveen
RW48 – Hoogeveen
RW33 – Assen-Zuid
RW34 – Zuidlaren
E22 (Highway 7) – Julianaplein (Groningen)

The entire route is constructed as a motorway.

Before the renumbering of the E-roads in the 1980s, this route was part of the E 35.

Route description

History

Exit list

See also

References

External links 
 UN Economic Commission for Europe: Overall Map of E-road Network (2007)

International E-road network
232
Motorways in Drenthe
Motorways in Gelderland
Motorways in Groningen (province)
Motorways in Overijssel
Motorways in Utrecht (province)
Transport in Groningen (city)